A chromodomain (chromatin organization modifier) is a protein structural domain of about 40–50 amino acid residues commonly found in proteins associated with the remodeling and manipulation of chromatin. The domain is highly conserved among both plants and animals, and is represented in a large number of different proteins in many genomes, such as that of the mouse. Some chromodomain-containing genes have multiple alternative splicing isoforms that omit the chromodomain entirely. In mammals, chromodomain-containing proteins are responsible for aspects of gene regulation related to chromatin remodeling and formation of heterochromatin regions. Chromodomain-containing proteins also bind methylated histones and appear in the RNA-induced transcriptional silencing complex. In histone modifications, chromodomains are very conserved. They function by identifying and binding to methylated lysine residues that exist on the surface of chromatin proteins and thereby regulate gene transcription.

See also
 Bromodomain
 Chromo shadow domain

References

External links
 Chromatin Remodeling: Chromodomains at cellsignal.com

Protein domains